Batman and Robin (nicknamed the Dynamic Duo) refers to the partnership between Batman and Robin, two superhero characters originally appearing in DC Comics, created by Bill Finger and Bob Kane, in debut 1940.

It is also the title of a number of fictional works starring the duo:

Batman and Robin (comic strip), a newspaper comic strip started in 1943
Batman and Robin (serial), a 1949 fifteen-chapter movie serial
Batman with Robin the Boy Wonder, an animated series started in 1969
The Adventures of Batman & Robin, the season two of Batman: The Animated Series, renamed in 1994
The Adventures of Batman & Robin (video game), a 1994 video game for the above series
Batman & Robin (film), a 1997 film starring Arnold Schwarzenegger, George Clooney and Chris O'Donnell
Batman & Robin (soundtrack), a soundtrack for the above film
Batman & Robin (video game), a 1998 game based upon the above film
All Star Batman & Robin, the Boy Wonder, a comic book series started in 2005
Batman and Robin (comic book), a 2009 ongoing comic book series by Grant Morrison
Batman vs. Robin, a 2015 animated film
Batman and Robin Eternal, a comic book limited series started in 2015

 
 
1940 comics debuts
1940 establishments in the United States
American male characters in television
Characters created by Bill Finger
Characters created by Bob Kane
Comics adapted into animated series
Comics adapted into plays
Comics adapted into radio series
Comics adapted into television series
1940 introductions
Comics characters introduced in 1940
DC Animated Universe characters
DC Comics adapted into films
DC Comics adapted into video games
DC Comics American superheroes
DC Comics male superheroes
DC Comics martial artists
DC Comics orphans
DC Comics superhero teams
DC Comics television characters
Fictional Yale University people
Fictional aviators
Fictional business executives
Fictional criminologists
Fictional engineers
Fictional escapologists
Fictional foster carers
Fictional detectives
Fictional gentleman detectives
Fictional hackers
Fictional inventors
Fictional martial arts trainers
Fictional philanthropists
Fictional socialites
Fictional torturers and interrogators
Fictional vigilantes
Film serial characters
Male characters in film
Male characters in television
Superhero duos
Superhero film characters
Superheroes with alter egos